Edible items are those items that are safe for humans to eat.

Edible may also refer to:

 Cannabis edible, a food or drink product that contains cannabinoids
 Eating, the ingestion of food
 "Edibles" (JoJo song), a song on the JoJo album Mad Love
 "Edibles" (Snoop Dogg song), a song on the Snoop Dogg album Bush
 Foraging for wild foods related to survival skills
 Edible Book Festival, an annual event honoring the birthday of Jean Anthelme Brillat-Savarin
Edible Arrangements, also known as Edible, US-based company selling arrangements of fruit

See also